Heinrich Hugo Karny (7 October 1886 – 7 August 1939) was an Austrian physician and entomologist who specialised in Thysanoptera and Orthoptera.

He was a friend of Lucien Chopard and they were regular correspondents during Karny’s medical work in the Dutch East Indies. Karny was born in Mödling and died in Kroisbach.

Collections
Karny’s collection is shared. Parts are in the Swedish Museum of Natural History (South Europe Orthoptera), other parts are in Buitenzorg Zoological Museum (Sumatra insects); National University of Singapore Raffles Museum of Biodiversity Research (insects from Mentawai Islands –shared with Buitenzorg); Steiermärkisches Landesmuseum Joanneum Graz (Gryllacridae); Senckenberg Museum in Frankfurt (Thysanoptera) and the Naturhistorisches Museum in Vienna (Orthoptera especially from Malaya).

Works
Partial list

 1907. REVISIO CONOCEPHALIDARUM. Abhandlungen der k.k. Zool.-bot. Ges. Wien 4(3):96
 Revision der Gattung Heliothrips Haliday. Entomologische Rundschau 28: 179–182 (1911)
 Beitrag zur Thysanopteren-Fauna von Neu Guinea und Neu-Britannien. Archiv für Naturgeschichte. Berlin 79: 123–136 (1913)
 Zur Systematik der Orthopteroiden Insekten, Thysanoptera. Treubia 1: 211–269 (1921)
 Beiträge zur Malayischen Thysanopterenfauna. VI. Malayische Rindenthripse, gesammelt von Dr. N.A. Kemner. Treubia 3: 277–380 (1923)
 Beiträge zur Malayischen Thysanopterenfauna. Parts VI–IX. Treubia 3 (3–4) (1923–1926).
 Results of Dr. E. Mjöbergs Swedish scientific expeditions to Australia 1910–1913. Gryllacridae. 1929.
 A revision of the South African Gryllacridae (Orthoptera Saltatoria) Ann. S. Afr. Mus. (1929).
 Orthoptera. Fam. Gryllacrididae. Wysman’s Genera Insectorum 206: 317pp (1937)
 Works listed by DNB

References 

Austrian entomologists
People from Mödling
1886 births
1939 deaths
20th-century Austrian zoologists